Agro–Adler Brandenburg was a German road cycling team that competed professionally between 1997 and 2001.

Major wins
1997
 Stage 1 Tour de l'Ain, Danilo Hondo
 Stage 7a (ITT) Rheinland-Pfalz Rundfahrt, Martin Müller
 Stage 9 Peace Race, Steffen Blochwitz
1998
 Stage 2 Tour de Pologne, Danilo Hondo
 Regio-Tour
Stage 1, Bert Grabsch
Stage 4, Danilo Hondo
 Stage 2 Hessen Rundfahrt, Danilo Hondo
 Stage 11 Olympia's Tour, Olaf Pollack
1999
 Stage 5 Deutschland Tour, Andreas Kappes
 Stage 9 Peace Race, Olaf Pollack
 Stage 5 Niedersachsen-Rundfahrt, Olaf Pollack
2000
 Stage 3 Niedersachsen-Rundfahrt, Christian Lademann
2001
 Brandenburg-Rundfahrt, Christian Lademann
 Stage 6 Peace Race, Christian Lademann

Notable riders
Danilo Hondo (1997–1998)
Bert Grabsch (1997–1998)
Olaf Pollack (1997–1999)
Martin Müller (1997–1999)
Volker Ordowski (1998)
Uwe Ampler (1999)
Andreas Kappes (1999–2000)
Steffen Blochwitz (1997–1999)
Andreas Beikirch (2000)
Roberto Lochowski (2000)
Christian Lademann (2000)

References

Defunct cycling teams based in Germany
Cycling teams based in Germany
Cycling teams established in 1997
Cycling teams disestablished in 2001